George McGrath may refer to:
 George McGrath (field hockey)
 George McGrath (footballer)
 George McGrath (jockey) (1943–2022), Irish jockey
 George F. McGrath, (died 1988) United States police commissioner